Officially, there is no such place as the Place Saint-Paul in Paris.

Nonetheless, to the citizens of this 4th-arrondissement neighborhood, the Place Saint-Paul is a real place near the Saint-Paul metro station and the Saint-Paul-Saint-Louis church.  Here, almost in front of the church’s north-facing doors, the Rue Saint-Antoine meets the Rue de Rivoli at a narrow angle, forming a triangular island to the west of the intersection where there are trees, benches, kiosks, an entrance to the Saint-Paul metro station, a carousel for children, etc.  Unofficially, this sliver of ground in the middle of traffic is the Place Saint-Paul, but most local people will tell you that the Place Saint-Paul extends a few tens of metres into the neighboring streets as well.

Perhaps a workable definition might be: the Place Saint-Paul is any place where either the Saint-Paul-Saint-Louis church or an entrance to the Saint-Paul metro station is within sight.  If so, then the portions of the streets closest to the Rivoli/Saint-Antoine intersection would be included: Rue Saint-Paul, Rue de Turenne, Rue de Sévigné, Rue Malher, Rue du Roi de Sicile, Rue Pavée, Rue Francois Miron, Rue de Fourcy, and Rue de Prévôt.

Both the "square" and the metro station take their names from the local church, the Church of Saint-Paul and Saint-Louis.  The area is also called "Métro Saint-Paul".  A hotel nearby, perhaps acknowledging the unofficial nature of the “Place Saint-Paul” name, calls itself "Hôtel de la Pointe Rivoli".

The triangular area described above, planted with two rows of trees, has existed since the extension of the Rue de Rivoli from the ancient Place du Marché-Saint-Jean, which is known today as the Place du Bourg-Tibourg, to the Rue Saint-Antoine undertaken by Baron Haussmann in 1854. As for the metro station, it was among the stops on the first section of Line 1 of the metro system, which opened on 19 July 1900, as part of a new service operating between Porte Maillot and the Porte de Vincennes.

There are old postcards that have pictures that clearly represent places in the Place Saint-Paul area, yet they are captioned Place des Juifs (Plaza of the Jews). The neighboring Jewish quarter (Rue des Rosiers, Rue Ferdinand-Duval, etc.) is called the Pletzl, (פלעצל, "little place" in Yiddish.) The "little place", which lent its name to an entire neighborhood, is also often identified as the "Place Saint-Paul".

Metro station

The Place Saint-Paul is:
 It is served by line 1.

See also 

 Pletzl
 Saint-Paul (Paris Métro)
 Squares in Paris

References

4th arrondissement of Paris
Saint-Paul